Hickory Lick Creek is a stream in Lincoln and
Warren counties in the U.S. state of Missouri. It is a tributary to Big Creek.

Hickory Lick Creek's name is illustrative of its setting.

See also
List of rivers of Missouri

References

Rivers of Lincoln County, Missouri
Rivers of Warren County, Missouri
Rivers of Missouri